Adriel Sanes (born 27 October 1998) is a swimmer from the United States Virgin Islands. He competed in the 2020 Summer Olympics.

References

1998 births
Living people
Sportspeople from Auburn, Alabama
Swimmers at the 2020 Summer Olympics
United States Virgin Islands male swimmers
Olympic swimmers of the United States Virgin Islands
People from Saint Croix, U.S. Virgin Islands
Sportspeople from Houston
Pan American Games competitors for the United States Virgin Islands
Swimmers at the 2019 Pan American Games
Auburn Tigers men's swimmers